Calothamnus brevifolius is a plant in the myrtle family, Myrtaceae and is endemic to the south-west of Western Australia. It is a small, highly branched shrub with almost cylindrical, pointed leaves and red flowers in summer. In 2014 Craven, Edwards and Cowley proposed that the species be renamed Melaleuca hawkeswoodii.

Description

The flowers are dark pink and arranged in short dense clusters of 1 to 5 around the stem, usually on the younger branches. The stamens are arranged in claw-like bundles with 15 to 20 stamens per bundle.

Taxonomy and naming
The specific epithet (brevifolius) is said to be derived from the Latin brevi meaning "short" and folius meaning "leaved", and refers to the characteristically short leaves of this species. In classical Latin the proper word for "short" is brevis (masculine and feminine) or breve (neuter). Folius is not attested as a single word in classical Latin, and can only be found as part of a compound in classical and botanical Latin.

Distribution and habitat
Calothamnus brevifolius is only known from the Piawaning, Cunderdin, Corrigin and Marchagee districts in the Avon Wheatbelt, Geraldton Sandplains and Mallee biogeographic regions. It usually grows in sand or loamy soil in association with Xylomelum angustifolium, Banksia prionotes, Melaleuca acuminata or Thryptomene prolifera.

Conservation
Calothamnus brevifolius is listed as "Priority 4" by the Western Australian government Department of Parks and Wildlife meaning that it is rare or near threatened.

References

brevifolius
Myrtales of Australia
Plants described in 1984
Endemic flora of Western Australia